Mansing Fattesingrao Naik is a leader of Nationalist Congress Party and a member of the Maharashtra Legislative Assembly elected from Shirala Assembly constituency in Sangli city.

Positions held
 2009: Elected to Maharashtra Legislative Assembly.
 2019: Elected to Maharashtra Legislative Assembly.

References

1959 births
Living people
Members of the Maharashtra Legislative Assembly
Nationalist Congress Party politicians from Maharashtra
People from Sangli